The music of the Back to the Future series is composed in conjunction with the development of several feature films and a stage musical, within the Back to the Future franchise created by Robert Zemeckis and Bob Gale. All music in the franchise was composed by American composer Alan Silvestri, with The Musical being co-written with Glen Ballard.

Back to the Future (1985)

Soundtrack 

Back to the Future: Music from the Motion Picture Soundtrack is the soundtrack album to the film of the same name, released on July 8, 1985, by MCA Records. The soundtrack includes two tracks from American composer Alan Silvestri's score for the film, two pop tracks from American rock band Huey Lewis and the News, two songs played by the fictional Marvin Berry and The Starlighters, one played by the fictional Marty McFly with The Starlighters, and two pop songs that are very briefly heard in the background of the film.

"The Power of Love" was released as the album's lead single in June 1985, becoming Huey Lewis and the News's first chart topper on the US Billboard Hot 100, as well as being certified Gold and nominated for an Academy Award for Best Original Song. The soundtrack spent nineteen weeks on the Billboard 200, peaking at number twelve in October 1985.

Development 
American rock band Huey Lewis and the News performed "The Power of Love" and "Back in Time". Huey Lewis was approached to write a theme song for the film. He met with Bob Gale, Steven Spielberg, and Robert Zemeckis, from the film's production team, who intended that the band be Marty McFly's favorite band. Though flattered, Lewis did not want to participate because he did not know how to write film songs and did not want to write one called "Back to the Future". Zemeckis assured Lewis he could write any song he wanted. Lewis agreed to submit the next song he wrote, which was "The Power of Love". The lyrics do not make any mention of the film's storyline.

Lewis was asked by Zemeckis to write one more song for the film's end credits, which came to be "Back in Time". Unlike "The Power of Love", the lyrics for "Back in Time" center around the movie's story points. In an interview with People in 2015, Lewis states: "Sean [Hopper], [Chris] Hayes and I put together "Back in Time" – and it turned out that it's actually quite easy to write for film! In a way, it's easier, in that you don't have to invest yourself in it. So that was a lot of fun, actually".

"Johnny B. Goode", written by Chuck Berry, is performed by the characters Marty McFly, and Marvin Berry and the Starlighters in the film, with lead vocals by Mark Campbell as Marty McFly, Harry Waters Jr. as Marvin Berry, and the guitar solo by Tim May. Campbell and May received a "special thanks" acknowledgment in the film's end credits, with the recording credit going to the fictional characters. Campbell did not receive credit as the filmmakers wanted to create the illusion that Fox was singing. When music supervisor Bones Howe learned of this, he secured Campbell a small percentage of the soundtrack revenue as compensation. Berry withheld permission to use "Johnny B. Goode" until the day before filming, and was paid $50,000 for the rights.

In the film 
In the film, Marvin Berry, a fictitious cousin of Chuck Berry, phones Chuck and lets him listen to the music. The real "Johnny B. Goode" was released in 1958, three years after the time it is played in the film.

Huey Lewis portrays a high-school band audition judge who rejects Marty McFly's band, the "Pinheads", as they perform an instrumental hard rock version of "The Power of Love". Lewis mentioned that his character was inspired by a Chrysalis Records executive. "Time Bomb Town", "Heaven Is One Step Away", and "Back in Time" are very briefly played in the background in some scenes during the film; "Back in Time" is additionally played in full in the film's end credits.

Track listing 

  Lead vocals provided by Harry Waters Jr.
  Lead vocals provided by Mark Campbell

Songs in the film but not included on the soundtrack album:
 "The Washington Post" – composed by John Philip Sousa
 "Mr. Sandman" – performed by The Four Aces
 "The Ballad of Davy Crockett" – performed by Fess Parker
 "Pledging My Love" – performed by Johnny Ace
 "Out the Window" – Performed by Edward Van Halen

The tracks are not presented in the order they appear in the film. In chronological order, the track listing goes: 1, 2, 7, the first 90 seconds of 6, 8, 9, 10, the remainder of 6, 4, 5, and 3. "Back to the Future Overture" consists of the following cues, as released in its original form, on the subsequent score album:
 Marty's Letter
 Clocktower
 '85 Lone Pine Mall

Charts

Certifications

Film score 

Back to the Future: Intrada Special Collection was released by Intrada Records on November 24, 2009, and contains Alan Silvestri's complete score for Back to the Future. It is a two-disc release: the first disc contains the complete orchestral score for the film, along with two source cues that Silvestri wrote. The second disc contains alternate approaches that Silvestri took with a large portion of the score, with a darker and more serious tone. The two-disc set had a limited release of 10,000 units and sold nearly 6,000 units by the end of January 2010.

The soundtrack was reissued on October 12, 2015, as a single-disc release, titled Back to the Future: Original Motion Picture Soundtrack (Expanded Edition), to commemorate the film's 30th anniversary. This release only contains the music on disc one of the initial limited two-disc set.

Development 
Alan Silvestri had previously worked with director Robert Zemeckis on the score for Romancing the Stone. In composing the score, the only direction Zemeckis gave him was "it's got to be big". Silvestri used an orchestral score to create a sound that contrasted with the small-town setting and the significant time-changing events occurring within it, and developed a heroic theme that was designed to be instantly recognizable in just a few notes.

For moments in the film where Silvestri's score was shortened (i.e. the final moments of "Einstein Disintegrated" and "Peabody Barn; Marty Ditches DeLorean"), replaced with source music ("Town Square") or unused ("Logo"), the full score cue is presented as originally recorded.

The themes from the score have since been included in the scores of the film's sequels, in Back to the Future: The Ride, and used as ambient music at Universal Studios theme parks.

Track listing 
Disc 1: The Complete Original Motion Picture Soundtrack
 "Logo"
 "DeLorean Reveal"
 "Einstein Disintegrated"
 "'85 Twin Pines Mall"
 "Peabody Barn; Marty Ditches DeLorean"
 "'55 Town Square"
 "Lorraine's Bedroom"
 "Retrieve DeLorean"
 "1.21 Jigowatts"
 "The Picture"
 "Picture Fades"
 "Skateboard Chase"
 "Marty's Letter"
 "George to the Rescue – Pt. 1"
 "Marvin Be-Bop"
 "George to the Rescue – Pt. 2"
 "Tension; The Kiss"
 "Goodnight Marty"
 "It's Been Educational; Clocktower"
 "Helicopter"
 "'85 Lone Pine Mall"
 "4x4"
 "Doc Returns"
 "Back to the Future"

Disc 2: The Creation of a Classic... alternate Early Sessions
 "DeLorean Reveal"
 "Einstein Disintegrated"
 "Peabody Barn"
 "Marty Ditches DeLorean"
 "'55 Town Square #1"
 "'55 Town Square #2"
 "Retrieve DeLorean"
 "1.21 Jigowatts"
 "The Picture"
 "Skateboard Chase"
 "George to the Rescue"
 "Tension; The Kiss"
 "Clocktower"
 "'85 Lone Pine Mall"
 "Doc Returns"
 "Ling Ting Ring"

Back to the Future Part II (1989) 

Back to the Future Part II: Original Motion Picture Soundtrack is the film score to the 1989 film of the same name, the second installment in the Back to the Future trilogy. It was released under MCA Records on November 22, 1989, and features most of the film score by American composer Alan Silvestri. AllMusic rated it four-and-a-half stars out of five. Unlike the previous soundtrack, it only contains the musical score by Silvestri, none of the vocal songs featured throughout the film are included.

Intrada Records reissued the soundtrack as a two-disc expanded edition on October 12, 2015, in commemoration of the first film's 30th anniversary. The soundtrack includes the complete score (22 tracks) on disc one and an arrangement of alternate cues and source music on disc two.

Track listings 
Standard edition
 "Main Title"
 "The Future"
 "Hoverboard Chase"
 "A Flying DeLorean?"
 "My Father!"
 "Alternate 1985"
 "If They Ever Did"
 "Pair O' Docs"
 "The Book"
 "Tunnel Chase"
 "Burn The Book"
 "Western Union"
 "End Title"

Expanded edition – Disc 1: The Film Score"
 "Back to Back / It's Your Kids"
 "Main Title (extended version)"
 "The Future"
 "Chicken / Hoverboard Chase"
 "A Flying DeLorean?"
 "I'm in The Future / Biff Steals DeLorean"
 "Chicken Needles / Jenn Sees Jenn"
 "Biff's World / 27th Floor"
 "My Father!"
 "Alternate 1985"
 "Gray's Sports Almanac / If They Ever Did"
 "Something Inconspicuous"
 "You'll Never Lose / Old New DeLorean"
 "Pair O' Docs"
 "The Book"
 "Nobody / Tunnel Chase"
 "Burn The Book"
 "He's Gone"
 "Western Union"
 "I'm Back / End Logo"
 "The West"
 "End Title"

Expanded edition – Disc 2: Alternates
 "Back to Back (alternate)"
 "Main Title (alternate)"
 "The Future (alternate)"
 "Hoverboard Chase (alternate)"
 "A Flying DeLorean? (alternate)"
 "Biff's World (alternate)"
 "If They Ever Did (alternate segment)"
 "You'll Never Lose (alternate)"
 "Western Union (alternate #1)"
 "I'm Back (alternate #1)"
 "Western Union (alternate #2)"
 "I'm Back (alternate #2)"
 "End Logo (alternate)"
 "The West (alternate)"
 "End Title (alternate)"

Back to the Future Part III (1990) 

Back to the Future Part III: Original Motion Picture Soundtrack is the film score to the film of the same name, the third and final installment in the Back to the Future trilogy. It was released under Varèse Sarabande on May 29, 1990, and features most of the film score by American composer Alan Silvestri. The soundtrack includes the acoustic instrumental version of the song "Doubleback" as performed during the film, but does not include the original ZZ Top version of the song played in the end credits.

Varèse Sarabande reissued the soundtrack as a two-disc expanded edition on October 12, 2015, in commemoration of the film's 25th anniversary. The soundtrack includes the complete score (26 tracks) in chronological order on disc one, and an arrangement of alternate cues, source music and acoustic renditions of traditional folk songs on disc two.

Track listings 
Standard edition
 "Main Title"
 "It's Clara (The Train, Part II)"
 "Hill Valley"
 "The Hanging"
 "At First Sight"
 "Indians"
 "Goodbye Clara"
 "Doc Returns"
 "Point of No Return (The Train, Part III)"
 "The Future Isn't Written"
 "The Showdown"
 "Doc to the Rescue"
 "The Kiss"
 "We're Out of Gas"
 "Wake Up Juice"
 "A Science Experiment (The Train, Part I)"
 "Doubleback (acoustic instrumental version)"
 "End Credits"

25th Anniversary edition – Disc 1: The Film Score
 "Back to Back / Court House"
 "Main Title"
 "Into the Mine / Tombstone / It's Me"
 "Warmed Up"
 "Indians (film version)"
 "Safe and Sound"
 "Hill Valley"
 "The Hanging"
 "We're Out of Gas"
 "There is No Bridge / Doc to the Rescue"
 "At First Sight"
 "Yellow"
 "The Kiss"
 "You Talkin' to Me?"
 "The Future Isn't Written"
 "Goodbye Clara"
 "What's Up Doc / Marty Gallops / To the Future"
 "Wake Up Juice"
 "Callin' You Out / Count Off"
 "The Showdown / The Kick"
 "A Science Experiment (The Train – Part I)"
 "It's Clara (The Train – Part II)"
 "Point of No Return (The Train – Part III)"
 "It's Destroyed / Back to the Girlfriend / It's Erased"
 "Doc Returns"
 "End Credits

25th Anniversary edition – Disc 2: Alternates
 "Back to Back / Court House (alternate)"
 "I'm Back / Main Title (alternate)"
 "Into the Mine / Tombstone (alternate)"
 "Warmed Up (alternate)"
 "Indians (alternate)"
 "The Hanging (alternate)"
 "Goodbye Clara (alternate segment)"
 "Count Off (alternate)"
 "The Kick (alternate)"
 "Doc's Return (alternate)"
 "Clock Dedication / Battle Cry of Freedom"
 "Doubleback (extended version)"
 "Turkey in the Straw"
 "My Darling Clementine"
 "Saloon Piano Melody"
 "Arkansas Traveler"
 "Devil's Dream"
 "Pop Goes the Weasel"
 "Virginia Reel (Tip-Top)"
 "I'm Back (alternate #2)"
 "Into the Mine (alternate #2)"
 "Indians (alternate #2)"
 "Doc Returns (alternate #2)"

On the standard edition, the tracks are not presented in the order they appear in the film. In chronological order, the track listing goes 1, 6, 3, 4, 14, 12, 5, 17, 13, 10, 7, 15, 11, 16, 2, 9, 8, and 18.

Songs in the film not included on the soundtrack album:
 "Doubleback" (original version) – performed by ZZ Top
 "The Power of Love" – performed by Huey Lewis and the News

The Back to the Future Trilogy 

The Back to the Future Trilogy is a soundtrack compilation album, released by Varèse Sarabande on September 21, 1999. The album is a compilation of Alan Silvestri compositions from all three Back to the Future film scores, as well the theme from Back to the Future: The Ride. Whilst the tracks from Part III are from the film's original soundtrack, the tracks for Part I, Part II and The Ride are re-recorded renditions performed by John Debney and the Royal Scottish National Orchestra at the Glasgow City Halls.

Track listing

Back to the Future: The Musical (2020) 

Back to the Future: The Musical (Original Cast Recording) is the cast recording of the musical of the same name, with music and lyrics by Alan Silvestri and Glen Ballard, and a book by Bob Gale. Recorded by the musical's original West End cast, it was released by Sony Music's Masterworks Broadway imprint on March 11, 2022. The musical's score was nominated for the Laurence Olivier Award for Best Original Score or New Orchestrations in 2022.

Background 
The Back to the Future website originally announced on October 21, 2020 ("Back to the Future Day") that a cast recording of the West End production will be released in summer 2021. The announcement was accompanied by the release of Dobson's rendition of "Back in Time", which was originally written for and featured in the first film, in addition to the original track "Put Your Mind to It". The cast recording was originally set to be released on November 26, 2021, but was delayed several times, eventually releasing on March 11, 2022.

Track listing

References 

Back to the Future (franchise) soundtracks
Alan Silvestri soundtracks
1980s film soundtrack albums
1990s film soundtrack albums
Lists of soundtracks